A wild river is a river that is intentionally kept in a natural state.

Wild river or similar terms may also refer to:

 Wild River Dam in Queensland, Australia
 Wild River State Park in Minnesota, USA
 Wild Rivers Recreation Area, New Mexico, USA
 Wild River (film), set in the 1930s, a 1960 Elia Kazan drama film on the social effects of a new dam
Wild Rivers (band)
 The River Wild, a 1994 film with Meryl Streep and Kevin Bacon being kidnapped while white river rafting 
 Wild Rivers (water park), a water park in California 
 Wild River (Androscoggin River), New Hampshire and Maine, USA
 Wild River Review, an online magazine
 National Wild and Scenic Rivers System, a river preservation act
 List of National Wild and Scenic Rivers